Rusli Hamsjin (born 29 June 1938) is an Indonesian former cyclist. He competed in the individual road race and team time trial events at the 1960 Summer Olympics.

References

External links
 

1938 births
Living people
Indonesian male cyclists
Olympic cyclists of Indonesia
Cyclists at the 1960 Summer Olympics
Sportspeople from Jakarta
Asian Games medalists in cycling
Cyclists at the 1962 Asian Games
Medalists at the 1962 Asian Games
Asian Games gold medalists for Indonesia
20th-century Indonesian people